Delivery Man is an ongoing South Korean television series starring Yoon Chan-young, Bang Min-ah, and Kim Min-seok. It is an original drama of Genie TV, and is available for streaming on its platform, and on TVING, Viki and Viu in selected regions. It also premiered on ENA on March 1, 2023, and airs every Wednesday and Thursday at 21:00 (KST).

Synopsis
The series is a comedic investigative drama about a taxi driver who grants the last wishes of ghosts.

Cast

Main
 Yoon Chan-young as Seo Young-min, a livelihood taxi driver who runs a one-of-a-kind business known as "Ghost-Only Taxi"
 Bang Min-ah as Kang Ji-hyun, a ghost who has lost her memory
 Kim Min-seok as Do Gyu-jin, a handsome doctor with perfect specifications

Supporting
 Kim Seung-soo as Ji Chang-seok, leader of the violent team at Dongpa Police Station
 Park Hye-jin as Park Bun-ja, Young-min's grandmother
 Park Jeong-hak as Kang Hyung-soo, Ji-hyun's father
 Heo Ji-na as Kim Hee-yeon, head nurse in the emergency room of Daehun Hospital
 Lee Hye-jung as Yoon So-ri, a new nurse at the emergency room of Daehun Hospital
 Lee Gyu-hyeon as Kim Jeong-woo, a nurse in the emergency room of Daehun Hospital
 Ha Kyung as Lee Dong-wook, a talented shaman

Extended
 Choi Tae-hwan as Na Seok-jin, Young-min's older brother
 Kim Seon-hyuk as Kim Byung-cheol
 Oh Su-jeong as Park So-yeon
 Moon Hee-kyung as Park Kyung-hwa
 Jo Mi-nyeo as Lee Eun-soo
 Lee Hye-eun as Kim Jin-sook
 Park Sun-ho as Kim Shin-woo
 Jeon So-min as a ghost
 Kal So-won as Choi Ha-yul
 Shin Yi-joon as Choi Mi-ra
 Woo Tae-ha as Baek Tae-woo
 Shin Bi as Yoon Ga-eun
 Jang Seon-yul as Choi Ha-jun

Viewership

References

External links
  
 
 

Korean-language television shows
ENA television dramas
South Korean fantasy television series
South Korean romance television series
South Korean comedy television series
South Korean mystery television series
2023 South Korean television series debuts

Television series about ghosts